Belfer may refer to

People
Arthur Belfer (1906–1993), American businessman 
James Belfer (b. 1987), American film producer
Lauren Belfer, American writer
Robert A. Belfer, American businessman

Other uses
Belfer Center for Science and International Affairs, a research center at Harvard University
Belfer (TV series), a Polish TV series